Coleophora glissandella is a moth of the family Coleophoridae. It is found in Canada, including New Brunswick.

The larvae feed on the seeds of Juncus balticus. They create a trivalved, tubular silken case.

References

glissandella
Moths described in 1942
Moths of North America